Håbo Municipality is a municipality in Uppsala County in east central Sweden. Its seat is located in the town of Bålsta.

The municipality was formed in connection with the local government reform of 1952.

Localities
Bålsta (seat)
Slottsskogen

Since 2001, the municipality is connected with the Stockholm commuter rail system by an extension to Bålsta Station. Coming with this, Bålsta now also offers interchange to regional railways, similar to Märsta, Sundbyberg and Södertälje.

See also
Håbo Hundred
 Because diacritics are often dropped on the English oriented Internet, Håbo is sometimes confused with Habo Municipality, located in Jönköping County in southern Sweden.

References

External links

Håbo Municipality - Official site

 
Municipalities of Uppsala County
Burial sites of the House of Eric